Duel is an ITV game show based on a format by Francophone production company French TV, hosted by Nick Hancock, broadcast on Saturday evenings. It ran from 19 January to 5 April 2008.

Format
Each 'Duel' consists of two contestants, who each began the game with 10 poker chips, which in turn each have the same monetary value. They are asked multiple-choice general knowledge questions without time limits, each with four possible answers, one of which was correct. The contestants are asked to cover the answer they believed to be correct with their chip; if they are unsure, they are permitted to cover up to four answers with their chips, to ensure that they have a chip on the right answer when revealed. Once satisfied they had done so, each contestant is asked to confirm their answer by pressing the 'Lock Down' button, at which point the further placement or removal of chips was halted. Contestants retained chips placed on correct answers. Each chip placed on a wrong answer was collected by the house and added £1,000 to the rolling jackpot, which began at a base £100,000.

Each contestant also has two 'Accelerators' (similar to the 'press' in the U.S. version of the show) at their disposal. If used, an Accelerator forced their opponent to answer any given question within seven (observant viewers will note it was actually eight) seconds of it being pressed; when those seven seconds expired, any marked answers are automatically 'locked down'. Contestants have to 'lock down' before playing an Accelerator, however; doing so before 'locking down' results in the immediate sounding of a short harsh error-tone played twice quickly and the accelerator being wasted (in the US and French versions, using an accelerator before locking in will result in an automatic lock-in and the accelerator will be played). If they still have their second accelerator available, Hancock would inform the contestant that they could still lock down and play the other accelerator if they wish.

At any point in the game, if a contestant did not cover the correct answer, the 'Duel' would end. If both players are wrong on the same question, they were both eliminated.

If a player wins their 'Duel', they play again with a new opponent, whom they selected from three candidates.

After a duel, the host will introduce 3 candidates to the duel winner. The winner only knows about the name, job and the age about the candidate. After picking a candidate, the candidate is invited to the duel table (while the other 2 unpicked candidates will return on next 3 candidates selection.) If however, nobody won the previous duel, then the 2 longest-waiting candidates invited directly to the dueling table.

For the first four shows of the series, after a second consecutive 'Duel' victory, the contestant was presented with two choices: to leave for a cash sum or to play on (entitled Cash or Chips). They were asked to randomly select one of two chips, which, once turned over, were marked "£" - representing a fixed total (worth £10,000 for two 'Duel' victories, £20,000 for three) and "%" - (worth 10% of the rolling jackpot for two 'Duel' victories, 20% of the jackpot for three - although money was never deducted from the jackpot total). The contestant then decided whether to bail out with the money offered to them or to continue their game, with the potential to increase their winnings should they successfully complete their next 'Duel'. If a contestant elected to leave the game, the two potential opponents who had waited the longest to play were automatically selected for the next Duel.

The rules were then modified (as of show five): after a second consecutive 'Duel' victory, the winning contestant was posed a bonus question via the 'Accelerator' (with seven seconds to respond), and given a further three chips to play with. The fewer chips used meant a higher guaranteed payout: £10,000 for one chip used, £5,000 for two and £2,500 for three. After a third consecutive 'Duel' victory, the rules were the same except that the values were doubled (£20,000 for one chip, and so on). Regardless of answers selected, however, the contestant played another Duel by virtue of having won the previous one. If they didn't cover the correct answer, they played on, but did not win any extra cash.

Four consecutive 'Duel' victories won a contestant the rolling jackpot. After this, the jackpot was reset to £100,000 and two next contestants who had waited the longest to play were invited for the next Duel.

A game was said to be a 'Pure Duel' when both players were down to one chip with no accelerators left. A finished game was also known as a 'Perfect Duel' if an opponent was knocked out losing all ten chips.

Jackpot winners
The first ever Duel jackpot winner was Robert, a social worker from Blackpool in Lancashire, who correctly identified that the US Masters is the only golf tournament to be held at the same venue each year. He won the £470,000 jackpot that had built up since the start of the series, and also took home his accumulated accelerator wins of £12,500, giving him a total of £482,500.

On 29 March 2008, the jackpot was won for the second time by banking lecturer Rob, scooping £215,000 (£190,000 jackpot plus £25,000 accumulated accelerator wins).

A week later, on the final show of the series, firefighter James won the third Duel jackpot of £166,000, plus his accelerator win of £20,000; a total of £186,000.

List of winners

From show 5 onwards, following Maurice Daniels' accident (according to the rule changes outlined above):

Reception
Readers of ukgameshows.com named it the best new game show of 2008 in their "Hall of fame" poll.

References

External links

2000s British game shows
2008 British television series debuts
2008 British television series endings
ITV game shows
Quiz shows
English-language television shows